James Oakes may refer to:

 James Oakes (historian) (born 1953), professor of history at the City University of New York
 James L. Oakes (1924–2007), judge of the United States Court of Appeals for the Second Circuit
 Jimmy Oakes (1902–1992), English footballer
 James Oakes (diarist) (1741–1829), diarist, businessman and banker
 James Oakes (MP) (1821–1901), British Conservative politician